San Gillio is a comune (municipality) in the Metropolitan City of Turin in the Italian region Piedmont, located about  northwest of Turin.

San Gillio borders the following municipalities: La Cassa, Val della Torre, Druento, Givoletto, Pianezza, and Alpignano. The economy is mostly based on agriculture.

References

Cities and towns in Piedmont